Federal elections were held in Switzerland on 29 October 1911. The Free Democratic Party retained its majority in the National Council.

Electoral system
The 189 members of the National Council were elected in 49 single- and multi-member constituencies using a three-round system. Candidates had to receive a majority in the first or second round to be elected; if it went to a third round, only a plurality was required. Voters could cast as many votes as there were seats in their constituency. There was one seat for every 20,000 citizens, with seats allocated to cantons in proportion to their population.

The elections were held under the new Federal law concerning the constituencies for the election of National Council members of passed on 23 June 1911. Following the 1910 census the number of 
seats was increased from 167 to 189, although the number of constituencies remained the same. Bern and Zürich both gained three seats, Aargau, St. Gallen and Vaud gained two, whilst, Basel-Landschaft, Basel-Stadt, Fribourg, Geneva, Graubünden, Lucerne, Neuchâtel, Solothurn, Ticino and Thurgau all gained one. A referendum on introducing proportional representation had been held in October 1910, and although it was approved by a majority of cantons, it was narrowly rejected by voters.

Results
Voter turnout was highest in Aargau at 83.1% (higher than the 80% in Schaffhausen, where voting was compulsory) and lowest in Obwalden at 21.1%.

By constituency

References

1911
Switzerland
1911 in Switzerland
Federal
October 1911 events